Zachary Darnell Graham (born March 28, 1989) is an American professional basketball player for Corinthians of the Novo Basquete Brasil (NBB). He played college basketball at Mississippi for four years. He was undrafted in the 2011 NBA draft.

Early life and college career
Zach Graham was born on March 28, 1989, in Suwanee, Georgia, and graduated from Peachtree Ridge High School in 2007. Graham played for Ole Miss Rebels from 2007 to 2011, where he averaged 9.4 points and 3.4 rebounds in 23.4 minutes while playing 135 games for them.

Professional career
Graham was automatically eligible for the 2011 NBA draft but he was not drafted.

Graham then played for the Reno Bighorns of the D-League where he played 43 games for them, 23 of them on which he started, averaging 10.9 points and 3.2 rebounds in 23.8 minutes.

On December 9, 2011, Graham was signed by the Atlanta Hawks but was released on December 17 of the same year.

The Air21 Express selected him as their import for the 2012 Governors' Cup where he played and started all 9 games and averaged 37.6 points and 12.6 rebounds in 44.8 minutes of action.

After his stint with Air21, Grahan them played for Maliye Milli Piyango in Turkey.

Graham once again returned to Air21, this time in the 2013 Governors' Cup, playing in 8 games and averaging 27 points and 9.8 rebounds in 44 minutes of action.

Graham was signed by Soles de Mexicali in 2012 where he played 43 games for them and averaged 18.8 points and 3.2 rebounds.

Graham was signed by Indios de Mayagüez of the Baloncesto Superior Nacional of Puerto Rico on March 17, 2014, but only played 5 games for them.

Graham was signed by Caciques de Humacao on April 19, 2014. He played 15 games for them.

In September 2014, he returned to Soles de Mexicali. In 50 games with them he averaged 20.8 points and 4.1 rebounds per game. On May 9, 2015, he signed with Brujos de Guayama of Puerto Rico for the 2015 BSN season.

On August 21, 2015, he signed with the Spanish club Estudiantes of the Liga ACB. On December 29, 2015, he parted ways with Estudiantes after appearing in seven games.

On September 18, 2016, Graham won the FIBA Intercontinental Cup with Guaros de Lara, and was named the FIBA Intercontinental Cup MVP after scoring 19 points in the game.

On December 16, 2017, Graham signed with the Israeli team Maccabi Haifa.

On July 11, 2018, Graham returned to Caciques de Humacao for a second stint, signing for the rest of the 2018 BSN Season.

Aguada
In June 2019 Graham signed with Aguada to play the finals of the LUB, he finished the tournament with 21 points per game, it was decisive for Aguada to be champions of the tournament.

Flamengo
In July 2019 Graham signed with NBB team Flamengo.

References

External links
 Eurobasket.com profile
 FIBA.com profile

1989 births
Living people
American expatriate basketball people in Brazil
American expatriate basketball people in Israel
American expatriate basketball people in Mexico
American expatriate basketball people in the Philippines
American expatriate basketball people in Spain
American expatriate basketball people in Turkey
American expatriate basketball people in Venezuela
Air21 Express players
Basketball players from Georgia (U.S. state)
Caciques de Humacao players
CB Estudiantes players
Guaros de Lara (basketball) players
Liga ACB players
Flamengo basketball players
Indios de Mayagüez basketball players
Novo Basquete Brasil players
Maccabi Haifa B.C. players
Ole Miss Rebels men's basketball players
People from Suwanee, Georgia
Philippine Basketball Association imports
Reno Bighorns players
Shooting guards
Small forwards
Soles de Mexicali players
Sportspeople from the Atlanta metropolitan area
American men's basketball players